Christmas Symphony II is an album by Mannheim Steamroller, released in 2013.

Track listing
 Carol of the Bells
 Veni Veni
 Away in a Manger
 Joy to the World
 Christmas Lullaby
 Hallelujah
 Do You Hear What I Hear?
 Lo How A Rose E'er Blooming
 Traditions of Christmas
 Good King Wenceslas
 We Three Kings
 Pat a Pan/Fum, Fum, Fum Medley
 Auld Lang Syne

References

2013 Christmas albums
Mannheim Steamroller albums
Classical Christmas albums
New-age Christmas albums
American Gramaphone Christmas albums
American Gramaphone albums